The St. Louis Mules was an American soccer club that was a member of the American Soccer League. Later in the 1972 season, the team became the St. Louis Frogs.

Year-by-year

Mules
Defunct soccer clubs in Missouri
American Soccer League (1933–1983) teams
1972 in sports in Missouri
1972 establishments in Missouri
Association football clubs established in 1972
1972 disestablishments in Missouri
Association football clubs disestablished in 1972